"I Never Met a Liar (I Didn't Like)" is a song recorded by Canadian country music artist Joan Kennedy. It was released in 1991 as the third single from her fourth studio album, Candle in the Window. It peaked at number 9 on the RPM Country Tracks chart in October 1991.

Chart performance

References 

1990 songs
1991 singles
Joan Kennedy (musician) songs
MCA Records singles
Songs written by Ron Hynes